A Time for Us is the thirteenth studio album by Hong Kong singer Joey Yung, released on 30 April 2009. The album includes the singles "可歌可泣" (the commercial theme for Broadway Electronics) and "搜神記". The album also contains the commercial themes for mega soft-drink company Coca-Cola (開動快樂) (which is a Chinese version of Open Happiness and fast food giant McDonald's (我所知的兩三事).

Track listing
CD
 可歌可泣 Move One To Praises And Tears
 我所知的兩三事 I Do Know A Thing Or Two
 搜神記 In Search of Deities
 It Doesn't Matter
 心賊難防 Can't Defend From A Heart Stealer
 花城 Flower City
 開動快樂 Open Happiness
 圓謊 Patching Up A Lie
 時不與我 Never With Me
 兩面 Two-faced
Bonus DVD
 可歌可泣 Music Video

Chart history

See also
 Joey Yung discography

Joey Yung albums
2009 albums